The Limnophilinae are a subfamily of tipulid crane flies. Some authors still use the name Hexatominae for this subfamily.

Systematics

Acantholimnophila Alexander, 1924
Adelphomyia Alexander, 1965
Afrolimnophila Alexander, 1956
Austrolimnophila Alexander, 1920
Bergrothomyia Alexander, 1928
Chilelimnophila Alexander, 1968
Clydonodozus Enderlein, 1912
Conosia van der Wulp, 1880
Ctenolimnophila Alexander, 1921
Diemenomyia Alexander, 1928
Edwardsomyia Alexander, 1929
Eloeophila Rondani, 1856
Epiphragma Osten Sacken, 1860
Euphylidorea Alexander, 1972
Eupilaria Alexander, 1932
Eutonia van der Wulp, 1874
Grahamomyia Alexander, 1935
Gynoplistia Brunetti, 1911
Harrisomyia Alexander, 1923
Hexatoma Latreille, 1809
Idioptera Macquart, 1834
Lecteria Osten Sacken, 1888
Leolimnophila Theischinger, 1996
Limnophila Macquart, 1834
Limnophilella Alexander, 1919
Medleromyia Alexander, 1974
Mesolimnophila Alexander, 1929
Metalimnophila Alexander, 1922
Neolimnomyia Séguy, 1937
Nippolimnophila Alexander, 1930
Notholimnophila Alexander, 1924
Nothophila Alexander, 1922
Paradelphomyia Alexander, 1936
Paralimnophila Alexander, 1921
Phylidorea Bigot, 1854
Pilaria Sintenis, 1889
Polymera Wiedemann, 1820
Prionolabis Osten Sacken, 1860
Prolimnophila Alexander, 1929
Pseudolimnophila Alexander, 1919
Rhamphophila Edwards, 1923
Shannonomyia Alexander, 1929
Skuseomyia Alexander, 1924
Taiwanomyia Alexander, 1923
Tinemyia Hutton, 1900
Tipulimnoea Theischinger, 1996
Tonnoiraptera Alexander, 1935
Tonnoirella Alexander, 1928
Ulomorpha Osten Sacken, 1869
Zaluscodes Lamb, 1909

References

Limoniidae
Nematocera subfamilies